Magdaléna Rybáriková was the defending champion, but chose not to participate.

Kurumi Nara won the title, defeating Moyuka Uchijima in the final, 6–2, 7–6(7–4).

Seeds

Draw

Finals

Top half

Bottom half

References
Main Draw

Kangaroo Cup - Singles
Kangaroo Cup
2018 in Japanese tennis